James  or Jim Drake may refer to:

 Jim Drake (director) (1944–2022), American film and television director
 Jim Drake (engineer) (1929–2012), American aeronautics engineer
 Jim Drake (rugby league) (1931–2008), English rugby league footballer of the 1950s and 1960s
 James Drake (engineer) (1907–1989), British chartered civil engineer
 James Drake (photographer) (1932–2022), American photographer
 James Drake (physician) (1667–1707), English doctor and political writer
 James Drake (politician) (1850–1941), Australian politician, member of the first federal ministry
 James Drake (visual artist) (born 1946), American artist
 James Drake (wrestler) (born 1993), English professional wrestler
 James A. Drake (academic administrator) (born 1944), American university president
 James A. Drake (ecologist) (born 1954), ecologist
 James F. Drake (born 1947), American plasma physicist
 James M. Drake (1837–1913), American soldier who fought in the American Civil War
 Nervous Norvus (1912–1968), performing name of Jimmy Drake